Friedrich Feher (born Friedrich Weiß, 16 March 1889 – 30 September 1950) was an Austrian actor and film director. He first entered the film business in 1913, starting out as an actor but quickly gravitated toward directing.

He is perhaps best remembered as Francis, the protagonist of The Cabinet of Dr. Caligari (1920). He directed The House Without Windows that same year (based on a book by Thea von Harbou), in which his art directors mimicked the Expressionist set designs of Caligari; it is now considered a lost film.

Feher died  in 1950 in Stuttgart at age 61.

Selected filmography
Actor

 Kabale und Liebe (1913)
 Emilia Galotti (1913) - Odoardo
 Die Räuber (1913) - Karl Moor
 Die Ehe der jungen Felicitas (1913)
 Stürme (1913)
 Die Befreiung der Schweiz und die Sage vom Wilhelm Tell (1913) - Hermann Gessler
 Theodor Körner (1914) - Theodor Körner
 Alexandra (1915) - Graf Erwin
 The Robber Bride (1916, Short)
 Lebenswogen (1917)
 Das neue Leben (1918)
 Bergblumen (1919) - Kunstler Daniel Thom Suhn
 Pro domo, das Geheimnis einer Nacht (1919)
 Der unsichtbare Gast (1919)
 Wie das Schicksal spielt (1920) - Erwin Freiburg
 The Cabinet of Dr. Caligari (1920) - Franzis
 The Three Dances of Mary Wilford (1920)
 Die tote Stunde (1920)
 Tyrannei des Todes (1920) - Toter
 Die sieben Gesichter (1920)
 Marionetten des Teufels (1920)
 Die rote Hexe (1921)
 Das Haus des Dr. Gaudeamus (1921)
 Die Geburt des Antichrist (1922)
 Die Memoiren eines Mönchs (1922) - Oginski
 The Tales of Hoffmann (1923)
 Der Rosenkavalier (1926) - Valzacchi
 Ihr Junge (1931) - Michowski
 Jive Junction (1943) - Frederick Feher (final film role)

Director
 Diamonds (1920)
 The House Without Windows (1920) aka Das Haus des Dr. Gaudeamus
 Confessions of a Monk (1922)
 Ssanin (1924)
 Forbidden Love (1927)
 That Murder in Berlin (1929)
 Když struny lkají (1930)
 Haunted People (1932)
 The Robber Symphony (1936)

Bibliography
 Jung, Uli & Schatzberg, Walter. Beyond Caligari: The Films of Robert Wiene. Berghahn Books, 1999.

References

External links

1889 births
1950 deaths
Austrian Jews
Austrian male film actors
Austrian film directors
Austrian male silent film actors
Male actors from Vienna
20th-century Austrian male actors